Estienne du Tertre (fl. mid-16th century) was a French composer. He spent most of his life in Paris and worked as an editor for the publisher Attaingnant. Many of his chansons were published.

Du Tertre published  in 1557, giving us the first use of the term "suite", although the usual form of the time was as pairs of dances.

External links
 

16th-century French composers
French male composers